Finno-Ugrian Society is a Finnish learned society, dedicated to the study of Uralic and Altaic languages. It was founded in Helsinki in 1883 by the proposal of professor Otto Donner.

The society publishes several academic journals, including:
 Mémoires de la Société Finno-Ougrienne (267 volumes )
 Finnisch-ugrische Forschungen (61 volumes )
 Journal de la Société Finno-Ougrienne (93 volumes ).

External links 
Home page (in English)

Uralic languages
Organisations based in Helsinki
Non-profit organisations based in Finland
Linguistic societies